Daratumumab/hyaluronidase, sold under the brand name Darzalex Faspro, is a fixed-dose combination medication for the treatment of adults with newly diagnosed or relapsed/refractory multiple myeloma. It is a combination of daratumumab and hyaluronidase. It is administered via subcutaneous injection.

The most common adverse reaction using daratumumab/hyaluronidase as monotherapy is upper respiratory tracts infection. The most common adverse reactions (≥20%) in people with amyloid light-chain amyloidosis who received daratumumab/hyaluronidase in combination with bortezomib, cyclophosphamide, and dexamethasone are upper respiratory tract infection, diarrhea, peripheral edema, constipation peripheral sensory neuropathy, fatigue, nausea, insomnia, dyspnea and cough. The most common adverse reactions (≥20%) occurring in people treated with daratumumab/hyaluronidase, carfilzomib, and dexamethasone were upper respiratory tract infections, fatigue, insomnia, hypertension, diarrhea, cough, dyspnea, headache, pyrexia, nausea, and edema peripheral.

Medical uses 
Daratumumab/hyaluronidase is indicated for the treatment of adults with multiple myeloma:
 in combination with bortezomib, melphalan and prednisone (D-VMP) in newly diagnosed adults who are ineligible for autologous stem cell transplant
 in combination with lenalidomide and dexamethasone (D-Rd) in newly diagnosed adults who are ineligible for autologous stem cell transplant and in people with relapsed or refractory multiple myeloma who have received at least one prior therapy
 in combination with bortezomib and dexamethasone (D-Vd) in adults who have received at least one prior therapy
 as monotherapy, in adults who have received at least three prior lines of therapy including a proteasome inhibitor (PI) and an immunomodulatory agent or who are double-refractory to a PI and an immunomodulatory agent.

In January 2021, the U.S. Food and Drug Administration (FDA) granted accelerated approval to daratumumab/hyaluronidase in combination with bortezomib, cyclophosphamide, and dexamethasone for newly diagnosed amyloid light-chain amyloidosis.

In November 2021, the FDA granted  approval to daratumumab/hyaluronidase in combination with carfilzomib plus dexamethasone to treat relapsed or refractory multiple myeloma in adults who have received one to three prior lines of therapy.

History 
It was approved for use in the United States in May 2020.

Efficacy of daratumumab and hyaluronidase-fihji (monotherapy) was evaluated in the COLUMBA trial (NCT03277105), an open-label non-inferiority trial randomizing 263 participants to daratumumab and hyaluronidase-fihj and 259 to intravenous daratumumab (daratumumab IV). The trial's co-primary endpoints were overall response rate (ORR) and pharmacokinetic (PK) endpoint of the maximum Ctrough on cycle 3, day 1 pre-dose. Daratumumab and hyaluronidase-fihj was non-inferior to daratumumab IV in evaluating these two endpoints.

Efficacy of daratumumab and hyaluronidase-fihj in combination with VMP (D-VMP) was evaluated in a single-arm cohort of the PLEIADES trial (NCT03412565), a multi-cohort, open‑label trial. Eligible participants were required to have newly diagnosed multiple myeloma and were ineligible for transplant.

Efficacy of daratumumab and hyaluronidase-fihj in combination with Rd (D-Rd) was evaluated in a single-arm cohort of this trial. Eligible participants had received at least one prior line of therapy.

Efficacy of daratumumab/hyaluronidase in combination with bortezomib, cyclophosphamide, and dexamethasone was evaluated in ANDROMEDA (NCT03201965), an open-label, randomized, active-controlled trial in 388 participants with newly diagnosed amyloid light-chain amyloidosis with measurable disease and at least one affected organ according to consensus criteria. Participants were randomized to receive bortezomib, cyclophosphamide, and dexamethasone (VCd arm) or with daratumumab and hyaluronidase (D-VCd arm).

Efficacy of daratumumab/hyaluronidase in combination with carfilzomib and dexamethasone was evaluated in PLEIADES (NCT03412565), a multi-cohort, open-label trial.

References

External links
 
 
 
 
 

Combination drugs
Antineoplastic and immunomodulating drugs